Acacia diminuta is a shrub belonging to the genus Acacia and the subgenus Phyllodineae. It is native to an area in the Goldfields-Esperance and Great Southern regions of Western Australia.

It blooms from October to November and produces cream-yellow flowers.

See also
List of Acacia species

References

diminuta
Acacias of Western Australia
Taxa named by Bruce Maslin